Vsyakaya vsyachina (which may be translated as Tutti-Frutti or All Sorts and Sundries) was a Russian weekly magazine, established in 1769. It was based in Saint Petersburg.

In 1770, there were 18 issues of the magazine entitled Барышек всякия всячины (Baryshek vsyakiya vsyachiny). Empress Catherine II was a private editor-in-chief of the magazine. Vsyakaya vsyachina ridiculed the morals and manners of the Russian gentry and protected moderate moralizing satire. At the same time, the magazine came out against oppositionary moods in the society, primarily attacking progressive satiric magazines published by Nikolay Novikov.

References

Defunct magazines published in Russia
Defunct political magazines
Magazines established in 1769
Magazines disestablished in 1770
Russian-language magazines
Political magazines published in Russia
Satirical magazines published in Russia
Weekly magazines published in Russia
Magazines published in Saint Petersburg